The Women's 100 metres T54 event at the 2012 Summer Paralympics took place at the London Olympic Stadium on 8 September.

Results

Round 1
Competed 8 September 2012 from 19:00. Qual. rule: first 3 in each heat (Q) plus the 2 fastest other times (q) qualified.

Heat 1

Heat 2

Final
Competed 8 September 2012 at 11:33.

 
Q = qualified by place. q = qualified by time. WR = World Record. RR = Regional Record. PB = Personal Best. SB = Seasonal Best.

References

Athletics at the 2012 Summer Paralympics
2012 in women's athletics
Women's sport in London